Satanische Pferde ("Satanic horses") is the third live album by German rock band Die Ärzte and featured leftover songs from Wir wollen nur deine Seele. It was only available to the fan club members. The name is a pun on The Satanic Verses ("Satanische Verse").

A download single, "Zu spät (live)", was available on 24 December 1999, as a teaser for the album.

Track listing
 "Radio brennt" (Radio burns) - 2:46
 "Außerirdische" (Aliens) - 2:23
 "Ohne Dich" (Without you) - 2:16
 "Alleine in der Nacht" (Alone at night) - 2:39
 "Sweet sweet Gwendoline" - 2:31
 "Madonnas Dickdarm" (Madonna's colon) - 2:11
 "Helmut K." - 2:27
 "Buddy Holly's Brille" (Buddy Holly's glasses) - 4:08
 "Ich ess Blumen" (I eat flowers) - 3:33
 "Mysteryland" - 3:34
 "2000 Mädchen" (2,000 girls) - 4:51
 "Du willst mich küssen" (You want to kiss me) - 3:59
 "Wie am ersten Tag" (Like on the first day) - 3:03
 "Dos corazones" (Two hearts [in Spanish]) - 3:25
 "Popstar" - 3:07
 "Frank'nstein" - 2:27
 "Sie kratzt" (She scratches) - 2:36
 "Vollmilch" (Whole milk) - 3:20
 "Ist das alles?" (Is that all?) - 3:40
 "Zu spät" (Too late) - 4:32
 "♀" - 8:34

Song information 
 Tracks 16, 20 from Debil
 Tracks 8, 12 from Im Schatten der Ärzte
 Tracks 4, 5, 10, 13, 19 from Die Ärzte
 Tracks 1, 11 from Ist das alles? (13 Höhepunkte mit den Ärzten)
 Tracks 7, 17 from Ab 18
 Tracks 2, 3, 9, 15, 21 from Das ist nicht die ganze Wahrheit...
 Track 6 from Live – Nach uns die Sintflut
 Track 18 from Die Ärzte früher!
 Track 14 from Die Bestie in Menschengestalt

Personnel
Farin Urlaub - guitar, vocals
Bela Felsenheimer - drums, vocals
Rodrigo González - bass guitar, vocals

Die Ärzte live albums
1999 live albums
German-language live albums